The Eighth Army is a U.S. field army which commands all United States Army forces in South Korea. It is headquartered at the Camp Humphreys in the Anjeong-ri of Pyeongtaek, South Korea. Eighth Army relocated its headquarters from Yongsan to Camp Humphreys in the summer of 2017. It is the only field army in the U.S. Army. It is responsible to United States Forces Korea and United States Army Pacific.

History

World War II

The unit first activated on 10 June 1944 in the United States, under the command of Lieutenant General Robert Eichelberger. The Eighth Army took part in many of the amphibious landings in the Southwest Pacific Theater of World War II, eventually participating in no less than sixty of them. The first mission of the Eighth Army, in September 1944, was to take over from the U.S. Sixth Army in New Guinea, New Britain, the Admiralty Islands and on Morotai, in order to free up the Sixth Army to engage in the Philippines Campaign (1944–45).

The Eighth Army again followed in the wake of the Sixth Army in December 1944, when it took over control of operations on Leyte Island on 26 December. In January, the Eighth Army entered combat on Luzon, landing the XI Corps on 29 January near San Antonio and the 11th Airborne Division on the other side of Manila Bay two days later. Combining with I Corps and XIV Corps of Sixth Army, the forces of Eighth Army next enveloped Manila in a great double-pincer movement. Eighth Army's final operation of the Pacific War was that of clearing out the southern Philippines of the Japanese Army, including on the major island of Mindanao, an effort that occupied the soldiers of the Eighth Army for the rest of the war.

Occupation of Japan

Eighth Army was to have participated in Operation Downfall, the invasion of Japan. It would have taken part in Operation Coronet, the second phase of the invasion, which would have seen the invasion of the Kantō Plain on eastern Honshū. However, the Japanese surrender cancelled the invasion, and the Eighth Army found itself in charge of occupying it peacefully. Occupation forces landed on 30 August 1945, with its headquarters in Yokohama, then the HQ moved to the Dai-Ichi building in Tokyo. At the beginning of 1946, Eighth Army assumed responsibility for occupying all of Japan. Four quiet years then followed, during which the Eighth Army gradually deteriorated from a combat-ready fighting force into a somewhat soft, minimally-trained constabulary. Lieutenant General Walton H. Walker took command in September 1948, and he tried to re-invigorate the Army's training, with mixed success.

Korean War
At the end of World War II in 1945, Korea was divided into North Korea and South Korea with North Korea (assisted by the Soviet Union), becoming a communist government after 1946, known as the Democratic People's Republic, followed by South Korea becoming the Republic of Korea. China became the communist People's Republic of China in 1949. In 1950, the Soviet Union backed North Korea while the United States backed South Korea, and China allied with the Soviet Union in what was to become the first military action of the Cold War.

The peace of occupied Japan was shattered in June 1950 when 75,000 North Korean troops with Russian made tanks invaded South Korea, igniting the Korean War. U.S. naval and air forces quickly became involved in combat operations, and it was soon clear that U.S. ground forces would have to be committed. To stem the North Korean advance, the occupation forces in Japan were thus shipped off to South Korea as quickly as possible, but their lack of training and equipment was telling, as some of the initial U.S. units were destroyed by the North Koreans. However, the stage was eventually reached as enough units of Eighth Army arrived in Korea to make a firm front. The North Koreans threw themselves against that front, the Pusan Perimeter, and failed to break it.  In the meantime, Eighth Army had reorganized, since it had too many divisions under its command for it to exercise effective control directly. The I Corps and the IX Corps were reactivated in the United States and then shipped to Korea to assume command of Eighth Army's subordinate divisions.

The stalemate was broken by the Inchon landings of the X Corps (tenth corps, consisting of soldiers and Marines). The North Korean forces, when confronted with this threat to their rear areas, combined with a breakout operation at Pusan, broke away and hastily retired north.

Both South and North Korea were almost entirely occupied by United Nations forces. However, once U.S. units neared the Yalu River and the frontier between North Korea and China, the Chinese intervened and drastically changed the character of the war. Eighth Army was decisively defeated at the Battle of the Chongchon River and forced to retreat all the way back to South Korea. The defeat of the U.S. Eighth Army resulted in the longest retreat of any U.S. military unit in history. General Walker was killed in a jeep accident on 23 December 1950, and replaced by Lieutenant General Matthew Ridgway. The overstretched Eighth Army suffered heavily with the Chinese offensive, who were able to benefit from shorter lines of communication and with rather casually deployed enemy forces. The Chinese broke through the U.S. defenses despite U.S. air supremacy and the Eighth Army and U.N. forces retreated hastily to avoid encirclement. The Chinese offensive continued pressing U.S. forces, which lost Seoul, the South Korean capital. Eighth Army's morale and esprit de corps hit rock bottom, to where it was widely regarded as a broken, defeated rabble.

General Ridgway forcefully restored Eighth Army to combat effectiveness over several months. Eighth Army slowed and ultimately halted the Chinese advance at the battles of Chipyong-ni and Wonju. It then counter-attacked the Chinese, re-took Seoul, and drove to the 38th parallel, where the front stabilized.

When General Ridgway replaced General of the Army Douglas MacArthur as the overall U.N. commander, Lieutenant General James Van Fleet assumed command of Eighth Army. After the war of movement during the first stages, the fighting in Korea settled down to a war of attrition. Ceasefire negotiations were begun at the village of Panmunjom in the summer of 1951, and they dragged on for two years. During the final combat operation of the war, Lieutenant General Maxwell D. Taylor (promoted to general 23 June 1953) commanded the Eighth Army. When the Military Demarcation Line was finally agreed to by the Korean Armistice Agreement, South Korea and North Korea continued on as separate states.

Guarding Korea 

During the aftermath of the Korean War, the Eighth Army remained in South Korea. By the 1960s, I Corps, consisting of the 7th Infantry Division and the 2nd Infantry Division, remained as part of the Eighth Army. Then, in 1971, the 7th Infantry Division was withdrawn, along with the command units of I Corps, which were moved across the Pacific Ocean to Fort Lewis, Washington. Later, in March 1977, a memo from President Jimmy Carter said "...American forces will be withdrawn. Air cover will be continued." Bureaucratic resistance from the Executive Branch, with support in Congress, eventually saw the proposal watered down. Eventually one combat battalion and about 2,600 non-combat troops were withdrawn.

This left the 2nd Infantry Division at the Korean Demilitarized Zone to assist the South Korean Army. Besides forming a trip-wire against another North Korean invasion, the 2nd Infantry Division remained there as the only Army unit in South Korea armed with tactical nuclear weapons. (Otherwise, there is only the U.S. Air Force in South Korea and on Okinawa.)  All nuclear weapons were taken from the Army to be under Air Force control. Later, in 1991, all U.S. nuclear weapons were removed from South Korea.

Structure 1989 

At the end of the Cold War Eighth Army consisted of the following units:

  Eighth Army, Yongsan Garrison, South Korea
 Headquarters & Headquarters Company
  2nd Infantry Division, Camp Casey 
  17th Aviation Brigade, Camp Coiner
 Headquarters & Headquarters Company
 4th Battalion, 58th Aviation (Air Traffic Control), Camp Coiner
 1st Battalion, 501st Aviation (Assault), Camp Coiner (UH-60A Black Hawk helicopters)
 2nd Battalion, 501st Aviation (Medium Lift), Camp Coiner (CH-47D Chinook helicopters)
 4th Battalion, 501st Aviation (Attack), Camp Page (AH-1F Cobra & OH-58C Kiowa helicopters)
 5th Battalion, 501st Aviation (Attack), Camp Coiner (AH-1F Cobra & OH-58C Kiowa helicopters)
  1st Signal Brigade, Camp Humphreys
 Headquarters & Headquarters Company
 36th Signal Battalion
 41st Signal Battalion
 304th Signal Battalion, Camp Colbern
 307th Signal Battalion
 257th Signal Company, Camp Humphreys
  8th Military Police Brigade (Provisional), Camp Coiner
 Headquarters & Headquarters Company
 94th Military Police Battalion
 728th Military Police Battalion
  501st Military Intelligence Brigade (Provisional), Yongsan Garrison
 Headquarters & Headquarters Detachment
 3rd Military Intelligence Battalion (Aerial Exploitation), Camp Humphreys
 524th Military Intelligence Battalion (Human Intelligence)
 532nd Military Intelligence Battalion (Intelligence & Electronic Warfare)
 751st Military Intelligence Battalion (Counterintelligence), Camp Humphreys
  18th Medical Command, Seoul (the following peacetime listing is incomplete)
 Headquarters and Headquarters Detachment
 52nd Medical Battalion
 121st Combat Support Hospital, Camp Humphreys
  19th Support Command, Daegu (the following peacetime listing is incomplete)
 Headquarters and Headquarters Company
 Special Troops Battalion
 20th Area Support Group, Camp Henry
 Headquarters and Headquarters Company
 23rd Area Support Group, Camp Humphreys
 Headquarters and Headquarters Company
 194th Maintenance Battalion
 227th Maintenance Battalion
 Company A, 3rd Battalion 501st Aviation (Aviation Intermediate Maintenance), Camp Humphreys
 Company A, 3rd Battalion, 501st Aviation (Aviation Intermediate Maintenance), Camp Humphreys
 25th Transportation Center (Movement Control), Yongsan Garrison
 21st Transportation Company (Command Transport), Yongsan Garrison
 46th Transportation Company, Camp Carroll
 34th Area Support Group, Seoul
 Headquarters and Headquarters Company
 501st Corps Support Group, Camp Red Cloud
 Headquarters and Headquarters Company
 8th Personnel Command
 516th Personnel Service Company
 175th Finance Center
 176th Finance Support Unit
 177th Finance Support Unit
 23rd Chemical Battalion
 44th Engineer Battalion (Combat) (Heavy), Camp Mercer
 8th Army Band

Recent times 
In 2003, plans were announced to move the 2nd Infantry Division southward. The division, with 15 bases north of the Han River and just south of the DMZ, was to be the most important formation to be moved south of the Han River in two phases "over the next few years" a joint statement between the South Korean and U.S. governments said on June 5, 2003.As of 2015, it appears that one brigade of the 2nd Infantry Division will remain at Camp Casey, near Dongducheon.

The headquarters of the Eighth Army was Yongsan Garrison, but moved southward to Camp Humphreys by 2019. In April 2017 the Eighth Army headquarters began its move from Yongsan to Camp Humphreys and held a ceremony to relocate a statue of General Walton Walker.

Structure (February 2023) 

 Eighth Army, USAG Humphreys

 Eighth Army Headquarters and Headquarters Battalion
 2d Infantry Division (Joint United States and South Korean Army)
 2d Infantry Division Combined Division Staff (Joint United States and South Korean Army)
 Headquarters and Headquarters Battalion
 Rotational Stryker Brigade Combat Team
 210th Field Artillery Brigade
 Headquarters and Headquarters Battery
 210th Field Artillery Brigade Headquarters and Headquarters Battery
 1st Battalion, 38th Field Artillery Regiment
 6th Battalion, 37th Field Artillery Regiment
 Rotational M270 MLRS Field Artillery Battalion
 70th Brigade Support Battalion
 Combat Aviation Brigade, 2d Infantry Division
 Headquarters and Headquarters Company
 2d Battalion (Assault), 2d Aviation Regiment
 3d Battalion (General Support), 2d Aviation Regiment
 4th Battalion (Attack), 2d Aviation Regiment
 5th Squadron (Attack/Reconnaissance), 17th Cavalry Regiment
 Company E, 2d Aviation Regiment (General Atomics MQ-1C Gray Eagle)
 602d Aviation Support Battalion
 2nd Infantry Division Sustainment Brigade
 Headquarters and Headquarters Company
 Special Troops Battalion
 194th Combat Sustainment Support Battalion
 1st Signal Brigade, subordinate to 311th Signal Command / US Army Pacific
 Headquarters and Headquarters Company
 United States Army Communications Information Systems Activity, Pacific
 41st Signal Battalion
 304th Expeditionary Signal Battalion
 19th Expeditionary Sustainment Command
 Headquarters and Headquarters Company
 94th Military Police Battalion
 Materiel Support Command Korea
 6th Ordnance Battalion
 25th Transportation Battalion
 498th Combat Sustainment Support Battalion
 Korean Service Corps
 35th Air Defense Artillery Brigade
 Headquarters and Headquarters Battery
 2d Battalion, 1st Air Defense Artillery Regiment (Patriot)
 6th Battalion, 52d Air Defense Artillery Regiment (Patriot)
 Battery D, 2d Air Defense Artillery Regiment (THAAD)
 65th Medical Brigade
 Headquarters and Headquarters Company
 549th Hospital Center
 168th Medical Battalion (Multifunctional)
 618th Dental Company
 106th Medical Detachment (Veterinary Specialist Services)
 U.S. Army Medical Materiel Center – Korea
 501st Military Intelligence Brigade
 Headquarters and Headquarters Company
 3d Military Intelligence Battalion
 368th Military Intelligence Battalion (US Army Reserve), at Parks Reserve Forces Training Area, California
 524th Military Intelligence Battalion
 532d Military Intelligence Battalion
 719th Military Intelligence Battalion
 United Nations Command Security Battalion, Joint Security Area
 Korean Field Office
 Army Special Operations Forces Liaison Element, Korea
 Joint United States Military Affairs Group - Korea
 Eighth Army Non-Commissioned Officers Academy
 Training Support Activity, Korea
 11th Engineer Battalion, subordinate to 130th Engineer Brigade / US Army Pacific
 23rd Chemical Battalion
 4th Airfield Operations Battalion, 58th Aviation Regiment
 2501st Digital Liaison Detachment - headquartered at Camp Yongin. The detachment deploys in support of First (Wonju) and Third (Yongin) Republic of Korea Armies (FROKA/TROKA) and the soon to be Combined Ground Component Command (CGCC) to provide continuous liaison capability between Eighth Army and the two ROK Field Army headquarters.
 2502d Digital Liaison Detachment
 3d Battlefield Coordination Detachment
 United States Army Corps of Engineers, Far East District
 Eighth Army Band

Other army units based in South Korea:
 403rd Army Field Support Brigade, Camp Henry, part of Army Sustainment Command
 Army Field Support Battalion - Korea 
 Army Field Support Battalion - Northeast Asia
 837th Transportation Battalion, part of 599th Transportation Brigade / Military Surface Deployment and Distribution Command

Specific units

8th Army Band

The 8th Army Band is the official musical unit of the HQ 8th Army and supports United States Forces Korea and the United Nations Command. The 62 member band was founded in 1916 as the Band of the 35th Infantry Regiment. During World War II, the band, then known as the 25th Infantry Division Band based out of Hawaii, served in the Pacific Theater, being a participant in Central Pacific and Guadalcanal campaigns. It was reorganized in November 1950 and reassigned to the newly formed ROK, the same year the Korean War began. Awards and honors the band has received include the Meritorious Unit Commendation and two Republic of Korea Presidential Unit Citations. Nicknamed Freedom's Ambassadors due to its area of responsibility, it has performed at events such as the Wonju Tattoo, the Gangwon International Tattoo as well as Korean War memorial ceremonies in the country. The Alliance Brass, an ensemble in the 8th Army Band, celebrated its 99th anniversary in Mongolia in June 2015 with a concert on Sükhbaatar Square.

Korean Service Corps
The Korean Service Corps was a reserve force composed of South Korean volunteers who were augmented to the 8th Army. They provided labourers who were used to carry ammunition and supplies, and support the overall logistic elements of the army. It is today, a paramilitary civilian formation that is battalion-sized. Continuing is role as a combat service support unit, it is capable of being expanded and mobilized during a wartime situation.

List of commanders

References

External links

 Eighth Army – Official Homepage
 GlobalSecurity: Eighth Army
 

008 Army
Military units of the United States Army in South Korea
Military units and formations established in 1944
USFldArmy0008